Vadym Serhiyovych Mashchenko (born 26 July 2000) is a Ukrainian professional footballer who plays as a right winger for FS Jelgava.

Club career

Early years
Vadym Mashchenko started his career at Olimp from Starobilsk in 2012. One year later he moved to  the youth ranks of Zorya Luhansk.

Dynamo Kyiv
At the age of 14 he moved to the youth ranks of Dynamo Kyiv.

Chornomorets Odesa
In February 2021 he moved on loan to Chornomorets Odesa.

Baltic 
From summer 2022 was on loan to FK Jonava. On 16 August 2022 played LFF Cup match against FC Hegelmann.

21 August 2022 he made debut in A Lyga against FK Žalgiris. 16 September 2022 he scored goal against FK Kauno Žalgiris.

Ahead of the 2023 he was transferred to Latvian Higher League newcomers FS Jelgava.

References

External links
 Profile on Chornomorets Odesa official website
 Statistics at UAF website (Ukr)

2000 births
Living people
People from Krasnoperekopsk Raion
Ukrainian First League players
Ukrainian Premier League players
FC Dynamo Kyiv players
FC Chornomorets Odesa players
Association football forwards
Ukrainian footballers
Ukraine youth international footballers
Ukrainian expatriate footballers
Expatriate footballers in Lithuania
Ukrainian expatriate sportspeople in Lithuania
Expatriate footballers in Latvia
Ukrainian expatriate sportspeople in Latvia
A Lyga players